Princess Hermine of Schaumburg-Lippe (Bückeburg, 5 October 1845 – Regensburg, 23 December 1930) was a member of the princely family of Schaumburg-Lippe who was the consort of Duke Maximilian of Württemberg from 1876 until his death in 1888.

Family and early life
Princess Hermine was born on 5 October 1845 in Bückeburg, the capital of the Principality of Schaumburg-Lippe, during the reign of her paternal grandfather, George William, Prince of Schaumburg-Lippe. She was the eldest daughter of Adolf, Hereditary Prince of Schaumburg-Lippe and his wife Princess Hermine of Waldeck and Pyrmont. Her siblings included Prince Georg of Schaumburg-Lippe, who later succeeded as reigning prince of Schaumburg-Lippe and Prince Adolf of Schaumburg-Lippe, husband of Princess Viktoria of Prussia.

Despite their high birth, Princess Hermine and her siblings were brought up very simply; one report said they "knew more about the kitchen than many women of lower degree". They were also well educated, and were able to hold their own in discussions about philosophy and science with the learned men in the principality.

Marriage
On 16 February 1876, Hermine married Duke Maximilian of Württemberg, a son of the German naturalist and explorer Duke Paul Wilhelm of Württemberg and Princess Maria Sophia of Thurn and Taxis. Duke Paul Wilhelm was a member of the ducal and Silesian branch of the House of Württemberg. The marriage was childless.

Death
Hermine died on 23 December 1930, at the age of 85 at Regensburg.

Ancestry

References

External links

1845 births
1930 deaths
House of Lippe
Princesses of Schaumburg-Lippe
House of Württemberg
Duchesses of Württemberg
People from Bückeburg
Daughters of monarchs